NFL Quarterback Club 2000 is a sports video game developed by Acclaim Studios Austin and published by Acclaim Entertainment for Nintendo 64 and Dreamcast in 1999.

Reception

The game received unfavorable reviews on both platforms according to the review aggregation website GameRankings. Blake Fischer of Next Generation called the Dreamcast version "A half-hearted effort with too many flaws to be considered worthy of play against the NFL 2K football juggernaut."

References

External links

1999 video games
Dreamcast games
NFL Quarterback Club
Nintendo 64 games
Acclaim Entertainment games
Video games developed in the United States